Sadayankuppam is a residential/industrial area in northern part of Chennai, a metropolitan city in Tamil Nadu, India. It is the largest ward in Greater Chennai Corporation in terms of area.

Surroundings

References

External links
Corporation of Chennai

Neighbourhoods in Chennai